Constantin Van Rijckevorsel (born 24 June 1976) is a Belgian equestrian. He competed at the 1996 Summer Olympics, the 2000 Summer Olympics and the 2004 Summer Olympics.

References

External links
 

1976 births
Living people
Belgian male equestrians
Olympic equestrians of Belgium
Equestrians at the 1996 Summer Olympics
Equestrians at the 2000 Summer Olympics
Equestrians at the 2004 Summer Olympics
People from Uccle
Sportspeople from Brussels
21st-century Belgian people